The Washington nickel is a pattern coin that was struck by the United States Mint in 1866 and again in 1909 and 1910.

1866 pieces 
The Washington nickel was one of several proposed designs for the five-cent nickel coin, which was to replace the half dime as the five-cent coin of the United States. The obverse of the coin features a portrait of George Washington facing right.  This design was not chosen for production, and the Shield nickel was produced instead, although some patterns of the Washington nickel utilized some of the reverse designs that were eventually adopted for the Shield nickel.

The 1866 Washington nickel is relatively common for a pattern coin, and is popular with coin collectors.

1909–10 pieces 
In 1909 the US Mint once again struck nickel patterns with Washington's portrait.  The coin was produced in two major varieties, one with Washington facing right and one facing left.  Only seven pieces are known to exist, all of which are in the National Numismatic Collection at the Smithsonian Institution.

Two coins with Washington facing left were struck in 1910. These, like the 1909 pieces, are at the Smithsonian.

Obverse designs

Reverse designs

References 

1866 introductions
Five-cent coins of the United States
George Washington on United States currency
Sculptures of presidents of the United States